The Electoral Tribunal of the Federal Judiciary ( or ) is a venue within the judiciary of Mexico that specialises in electoral matters. Among its functions are resolving disputes arising within federal elections and certifying the validity of those elections, including those of the President of the Republic.
(Responsibility for declaring a candidate the winner in presidential elections previously fell on the Chamber of Deputies.)

It comprises a permanent seven-member Superior Chamber (Sala Superior), located in Mexico City, and five Regional Chambers (Salas Regionales), one in each of the circumscriptions into which the country is divided for purposes of organising congressional elections.  These Regional Chambers comprise three judges each, and are temporary in nature, sitting only during those years in which federal elections are held, and are based in the cities of Guadalajara, Monterrey, Xalapa, Mexico City, and Toluca. The architect of the Federal Electoral Tribunal in Monterrey, was reputed Mexican architect Manuel De Santiago-de Borbón González Bravo, great-grandson of Queen Isabella II of Spain, whose lifetime architectural legacy to Mexico amounts to 11,000,000 built square meters nationwide, including many famous buildings and sites.

There were two direct precursors of the TEPJF:
The Electoral Disputes Tribunal (Tribunal de lo Contencioso Electoral, TCE), an administrative (not judicial) body, that was in existence from 1986 to 1989.
The Federal Electoral Tribunal (Tribunal Federal Electoral, TRIFE), created by means of a series of constitutional amendments enacted in 1990, the same reforms whereby the Federal Electoral Institute was established. This tribunal was superseded by the current Electoral Tribunal of the Federal Judiciary in 1996.

The TEPJF is frequently referred to in the media by the acronym of its predecessor, the TRIFE.

The seven magistrates who currently sit in the Superior Chamber are:
Reyes Rodríguez Mondragón (president)
Felipe de la Mata Pizaña
Janine M. Otálora Malassis
Indalfer Infante Gonzales
Mónica Aralí Soto Fregoso
Felipe Alfredo Fuentes Barrera
José Luis Vargas Valdez

Functions 
The Electoral Tribunal is -according to the Mexican Constitution- the highest jurisdictional authority in electoral matters, and has the competence to resolve, in a final and unassailable manner, the following types of electoral controversies:

 Objections in federal elections of deputies and senators.
 Objections filed regarding the election of the President of the United Mexican States (resolved in sole instance by the Superior Chamber).
 Objections to acts and resolutions of the federal electoral authority, other than those mentioned above, that violate constitutional or legal norms.
 Challenges of final and definitive acts or resolutions of the local electoral institutes and courts (i.e., of the competent authorities of the federal entities to organize and qualify the elections, or to resolve disputes arising Objections such elections) that may be determinant for the development of the respective process or the final result of the elections.
 Objections of acts and resolutions that violate the political-electoral rights of citizens to vote, to be voted and to affiliate.
 Labor disputes or differences between the Electoral Tribunal and its officers; as well as between the National Electoral Institute and its public servants.
 The determination and imposition of sanctions by the National Electoral Institute to parties, groups and individuals or legal entities.
 The resolution of sanctioning procedures, related to the violation of the norms that regulate the access to radio and television of parties and candidates, the impartial application of public resources, the propaganda of public entities, electoral propaganda, as well as anticipated acts of pre-campaign and campaign.

Relevant Cases

Controversies of the 2006 general election 
Notwithstanding Andrés Manuel López Obrador's claims in the streets and in the press, on 5 August 2006 the Federal Electoral Tribunal declared in a unanimous ruling that the Alliance for the Good of All had failed to file valid complaints that would substantiate a claim for a complete national recount. Based on the valid complaints filed, the Tribunal ordered and conducted a recount of the votes in 9.07% of the precincts. In the partial recount, the Tribunal found that no evidence of widespread fraud. It did, however, find errors in the tally sheets and, in rectifying those errors, it corrected the final election results by adding and subtracting from each candidate to accord with the number of valid ballots cast for each.

Based on those results, on 5 September 2006 the Tribunal certified the PAN candidate Felipe Calderón as the lawfully elected next President of Mexico. Under law as reformed in the 1990s by Congress (including representatives of both the PAN and the PRD), this legal ruling of the independent Federal Electoral Tribunal is final.

Conflict with Ecologist Green Party of Mexico 

During the 2015 midterm elections the Ecologist Green Party of Mexico was the most fined party during the electoral campaigns for spreading prohibited propaganda. The Federal Electoral Tribunal decided to reduce the fine from 11,400,000 pesos to just 1,189,000.

Specialized bodies

Internal Comptroller's Office 

The Internal Comptroller's Office of the Federal Electoral Tribunal is in charge of monitoring compliance with the regulations and agreements issued by the Administration Commission, through audits, control reviews and evaluations of compliance with the management of the resources granted to the administrative units.
It also substantiates administrative liability procedures within the scope of its competence.

Documentation Centers 

The Documentation Centers of the Superior Chamber of the Federal Electoral Tribunal is an information unit specialized in electoral matters, to be an auxiliary in the institutional work of the Tribunal.

The Federal Electoral Tribunal has seven updated documentation centers on legal and political-electoral matters, which provide direct information services to staff and the general public.

Electoral Judicial School 

The Electoral Judicial School of the Federal Electoral Tribunal is an educational institution dependent on the Federal Electoral Tribunal, which is specialized in training, research, and disseminating information on electoral matters.

It offers postgraduate programs, training and update courses, academic events such as seminars, conferences, workshops, generates and manages specialized research on electoral jurisdictional matters, and coordinates editorial works.

See also
Federal Electoral Institute
Controversies of the 2006 Mexican general election

External links
Federal Electoral Tribunal website

References

Law of Mexico
Judiciary of Mexico
Elections in Mexico
Mexico